Howrah district is a district of the West Bengal state in eastern India. Howrah district is one of the highly urbanized area of West Bengal. It has thousands of years of rich heritage in the form of the great Bengali kingdom of Bhurshut. The district is named after its headquarters, the city of Howrah.

Geography

The Howrah district lies between 22°48′ N and 22°12′ N latitudes and between 88°23′ E and 87°50′ E longitudes. The district is bounded by the Hooghly River and the North 24 Parganas and South 24 Parganas districts on the east, on the north by the Hooghly district (Arambagh and Shrirampur sub-divisions), and on the south by Midnapore East district (Tamluk sub-division). On the west Howrah district is bordered by the Ghatal sub-division of Midnapore West district, and partly by the Arambagh sub-division of Hooghly district to the north-west, and the Tamluk sub-division of Midnapore East district to the south-west.

Boundaries of the district are naturally determined by Rupnarayan River on west and south-west, and by Bhagirathi-Hooghly river on east and south-east side. On north side, the boundary is an artificial one except for Bally Canal on north-east and Damodar River on north-west.

Annual normal rainfall is 1461 millimetre per year. Annual maximum temperature varies between 32-39 °C, whereas minimum temperature varies between 8-10 °C.

Divisions
Howrah District is split into the Howrah Sadar subdivision and the Uluberia subdivision. The Howrah Sadar subdivision has 1 municipal corporation with 1 municipality and 5 community development (CD) blocks. The Uluberia subdivision has 1 municipality and 9 community development blocks.

Each block consists of a rural area divided into gram panchayats along with census towns. The district has 30 police stations (Howrah Police Commissionerate has 16 general police stations including 1 Women PS, 1 Cyber Crime PS and Howrah Rural PD has 10 general police stations including 1 Women PS, 1 Cyber Crime PS), 157 gram panchayats and 50 census towns.

Demographics

According to the 2011 census Howrah district has a population of 4,850,029, roughly equal to the nation of Singapore or the US state of Alabama. This gives it a ranking of 23rd in India (out of a total of 640). Its population growth rate over the decade 2001-2011 was 13.31%. 63.38% of the population lives in urban areas. Haora has a sex ratio of 935 females for every 1000 males and a literacy rate of 83.85%. Scheduled Castes and Scheduled Tribes make up 14.82% and 0.31% of the population respectively.

Total area in Howrah District is 1467 km2. Total population is 4,273,099 as per census 2001 records. 57.91% of the population live in Howrah Sadar subdivision and rest 42.09% live in Uluberia subdivision. Population Density: 2913 per km2.

Religion 

Hindus are the majority population. Muslims, unlike the rest of Bengal, are more concentrated in urban areas than Hindus. Muslims are a significant minority in Panchla (46.62%), Uluberia I (43.92%), Uluberia II (39.36%) and Bagnan I (36.74%) blocks and make up a significant minority (44.79%) in Uluberia city.

Language

Bengali is the main language in the district. Hindi and Urdu are mainly spoken in urban areas.

Assembly constituencies

The district is divided into 16 assembly constituencies: Sankrail and Uluberia North constituencies will remain reserved for Scheduled Castes (SC) candidates. The division is represented in the Lok Sabha by the Howrah (Lok Sabha constituency) and Uluberia (Lok Sabha constituency) .

See also
2016 Dhulagarh riots

Notes

References

External links 

 
 Map of Howrah district at mapsofindia.com
Howrah district at West Bengal Tourism

 
Districts of West Bengal
1843 establishments in British India
Minority Concentrated Districts in India